A city council (Iriya) is the official designation of a city within Israel's system of local government.

City status may be granted by the Interior Minister to a municipality, usually a local council and whose character is urban, defined as having areas zoned for distinct land use like residential, commercial, and industrial areas.

City mayors and members of the city councils are elected every five years.

See also
List of cities in Israel
Local council (Israel)
Regional council (Israel)

References

External links
Local Government in Israel. The Knesset Lexicon of Terms. 2009
Local Authorities (רשויות מקומיות) on Israel Government portal 
 City Council Ordinance 

City councils
Subdivisions of Israel
City Councils